FC Kolos Buchach is an amateur football team based in a small city of Buchach, Ukraine. It plays in the Ternopil Championship (season 2018–19).

History
Notable the club became after 1965 when head coach of another amateur club Karpaty Broshniv-Osada (Ivano-Frankivsk Oblast), Petro Savchuk was invited to lead Kolos Buchach. Along with the coach, number of Karpaty's footballers moved to Kolos as well.

Honors
Ukrainian championship for collective teams of physical culture
 Winners (1): 1968
 Runners-up (1): 1966

Ternopil Oblast football championship
 Winners (8): 1966, 1967, 1968, 1969, 1970, 1971, 1972, 1973
 Runners-up (1): 2006

Coaches
 1965–1973 Petro Savchuk

References

Football clubs in Ternopil Oblast
Amateur football clubs in Ukraine
Kolos (sports society)
Association football clubs established in 1965
1965 establishments in Ukraine